Choi Kang-hee (born 12 April 1959) is a South Korean football manager and former player.

Club career 
Choi played for Hanil Bank and Army FC in the Korean Semi-professional League. After he accomplished his military service in ROK Army, South Korea's professional league (K League) was founded at a similar time, and he started his professional career by joining a K League club POSCO Dolphins. However, he transferred to Hyundai Horang-i after hearing the news of its foundation. He became a founding member of Hyundai Horang-i, and spent the rest of his playing career in there. He retired at the end of the 1992 season after a row with the club's manager Cha Bum-kun over Cha's training methods.

International career 
Choi was called up to the South Korean national team for the 1988 Summer Olympics. He played all three games, but South Korea were knocked out of the group stage in the Olympics. He was also included in South Korea's squad that came runners-up to Saudi Arabia in the 1988 AFC Asian Cup. He played three games in the Asian Cup.

Choi participated in the 1990 FIFA World Cup, playing three games for South Korea. However, South Korea failed to win a single game in the 1990 World Cup.

Managerial career 
The year after Choi retired as a player, he went to Leverkusen and Cologne in Germany to study football management. By 1996, he joined the coaching staff at Suwon Samsung Bluewings and then became an assistant to head coach Kim Ho as the club won the 2000–01 Asian Club Championship. He also became an assistant coach of the South Korean national team under Humberto Coelho.

Choi's first stint managing K League 1 side Jeonbuk Hyundai Motors lasted from 2005 to 2011. He focused on offensive tactics and transformed the team into one of the best in Asia. He led Jeonbuk to the K League 1 title in 2009 and 2011. He also won the AFC Champions League in 2006.

Choi repeatedly turned down offers to become South Korea national football team head coach after former coach Cho Kwang-rae was sacked. After being repeatedly offered the job, he finally accepted it on 21 December 2011. He insisted that his reign would only last until the end of World Cup qualifiers, saying, "I asked that [the contract only runs until June 2013]. What we need to do is qualify for the World Cup finals for the eighth time in a row... My mission is to take the national team to the finals. After that, a foreign coach should take over the team. If the KFA doesn't accept this, I won't sign the contract."

However, Choi's team showed poor performances in the final round (fourth round) of the 2014 FIFA World Cup qualification. While Cho managed the national team, they split into two factions, overseas clubs' players and K League players. Choi also failed to bring this team together, and received criticisms from the overseas players. South Korea narrowly qualified for the World Cup by finishing as runners-up in their group due to goal difference, although they were on the same points as third-placed team Uzbekistan.

Prior to the last qualifier against Iran in his country, Choi complained that Iran had provided poor training facilities and unfair treatments when his team had gone to Iran to play an away qualifier. Iran coach Carlos Queiroz hit back at this statement by claiming that Choi had humiliated the Iranian people and demanded an immediate apology. Instead, Choi said Iran seemed to make unnecessary provocations in desperation and that Queiroz would watch the World Cup on TV. Queiroz pinned the sad face of Choi on his black polo shirt and mocked him, and also offered to send Choi the jersey of Uzbek team as Choi said he would help Uzbekistan qualify for the World Cup finals over Iran. After Iran won this match, Queiroz showed his anger on Choi with a raised fist gesture which was deemed offensive by the Korean players and staff, almost causing a fight between the two teams.

Choi returned to Jeonbuk and led them to four more K League 1 titles in 2014, 2015, 2017 and 2018. He also led the team to its second AFC Champions League title in 2016. His successful career in Jeonbuk made him one of South Korea's most successful managers of all time, although his club caused controversy over bribing referees.

Career statistics

Club

Honours

Player
ROK Army
Korean President's Cup runner-up: 1980

Hyundai Horang-i
Korean League Cup: 1986
Korean National Championship runner-up: 1989

South Korea
AFC Asian Cup runner-up: 1988

Individual
K League 1 Best XI: 1985, 1986, 1988, 1991
Korean League Cup Best Player: 1986
Korean FA Best XI: 1988
K League 30th Anniversary Best XI: 2013

Manager
Jeonbuk Hyundai Motors
K League 1: 2009, 2011, 2014, 2015, 2017, 2018
Korean FA Cup: 2005
Korean League Cup runner-up: 2010
AFC Champions League: 2006, 2016

Shanghai Shenhua
Chinese FA Cup: 2019

Individual
Korean FA Cup Best Manager: 2005
K League 1 Manager of the Year: 2009, 2011, 2014, 2015, 2017, 2018
AFC Coach of the Year: 2016

References

External links
 
 
 

1990 FIFA World Cup players
1988 AFC Asian Cup players
Footballers at the 1988 Summer Olympics
Olympic footballers of South Korea
South Korea national football team managers
Jeonbuk Hyundai Motors managers
Pohang Steelers players
Ulsan Hyundai FC players
K League 1 players
Association football defenders
South Korea international footballers
South Korean football managers
South Korean footballers
Footballers from Seoul
Expatriate football managers in China
1959 births
Living people